Bonito Airport  is the airport serving Bonito, Mato Grosso do Sul, Brazil.

History
The airport was commissioned in 2005.

Airlines and destinations

Access

See also

List of airports in Brazil

References

External links

Airports in Mato Grosso do Sul
Airports established in 2005
2005 establishments in Brazil